Florence Aaronson (July 12, 1923 – January 14, 2022), known professionally as Flo Ayres, was an American radio actress and a founding member of the Washington, DC chapter of SAG-AFTRA.

Early life
Ayres had two brothers and a sister and attended Western High School. After high school, she studied at a drama school and worked with local theater groups for three years.

Career
In 1948, Ayres acted in Baltimore in a Johns Hopkins Playshop production of an English translation of Martine. In the 1950s, Ayres teamed up with Walt Teas, another nationally known voice from Baltimore, to become one of the first freelance voiceover teams in the radio industry. Over the next 30 years, Ayres, along with Teas and another personality, Joe Knight, recorded thousands of commercials and syndicated programs on a national scale, mostly at Baltimore's version of Hollywood, Flite Three Studios, and overseen by legendary audio engineer, Louis Mills.

In the 1960s and 1970s, Ayres also taught radio and communications at several Baltimore-area institutes of higher learning, such as Johns Hopkins University, Goucher College, and Towson University, and collaborated on projects with famous Vatican painter Joseph Sheppard and Beatles' photographer Morton Tadder. Ayres also had an extensive solo career spanning over 50 years. In addition to radio commercials, Ayres narrated for such institutions as the National Geographic Society, SeaWorld, and the AARP. For 25 years, Ayres hosted regular radio shows such as "Tuning into Life," "The Heart of the Matter," and she wrote and produced the radio series "For the Young at Heart". Ayres wrote, produced, and starred in a children's music CD about manners, entitled "Doo-zees and Don't-zees," which was released in May 2007.

In 1983, Ayres won an Addy Award from the American Advertising Federation and a Best in Baltimore Award from the Advertising Association of Baltimore for commercials that she made for the Baltimore Blast.

Later life and death
In retirement, even into her 90s, Ayres still produced occasional spots from her home in Baltimore, and from nearby B.H. Audio studios in Pikesville, Maryland. She died at her home in Baltimore  on January 14, 2022, at the age of 98.

References

External links 

 Baltimore Sun Article Flo 'Granny Packer' Ayres
 BlogSpot Article Walt Teas if you Please
 Goucher College Article Blame Brownlee
 Parents' Choice Foundation Parents' Choice Gold Awards

1923 births
2022 deaths
21st-century American women
Actresses from Baltimore
American radio actresses
American radio personalities
American women academics
Goucher College faculty and staff
Towson University faculty